Amplexopora is a genus of bryozoans of the family Amplexoporidae, known in the rock record from the Ordovician to the Permian periods. Species belonging to this genus were stationary epifaunal suspension feeders. Their colonies showed a very great variety in shapes.

Selected species
 Amplexopora conferta (Coryell, 1921)
 Amplexopora gigantea (Termier and Termier 1971)
 Amplexopora tezakensis (Termier and Termier 1971)
 Amplexopora minnesotensis (Ulrich, 1893)
 Amplexopora winchelli (Ulrich, 1886)

Distribution
Fossils of this genus have been found in Permian of Afghanistan, in Silurian of Norway, Russia and United Kingdom and in Ordovician of Argentina, Australia, Canada, France, United States.

References

Paleobiology Database
Sepkoski's Online Genus Database

External links
Fossils and strata of the Type Cincinnatian
TAXA REPORTED FROM THE TYPE-CINCINNATIAN

Trepostomata
Stenolaemata genera
Prehistoric bryozoan genera
Ordovician bryozoans
Darriwilian first appearances
Guadalupian genus extinctions
Paleozoic life of the Northwest Territories